Shin'ai Naru Kimi e (To my beloved you) is Jun Shibata's sixth studio album. It was released on 18 June 2008.

Track listing
Colorful (カラフル; Colorful)
Tsubaki (椿; Camellia)
Ai wo suru hito (愛をする人; People Who Fall in Love)
Melody (メロディ; Melody)
38.0℃～Piano Solo
Kimi e (君へ; To You)
Juu kazoete (十数えて; Count to Ten)
Futari (ふたり; Us)
Naite ii hi made (泣いていい日まで; Until the Day When It's Okay to Cry)
Kotori to kaze (小鳥と風; A Small Bird and the Wind)

Charts

External links
http://www.shibatajun.com— Shibata Jun Official Website 

2008 albums
Victor Entertainment albums
Jun Shibata albums